Arophyton is a genus of flowering plants in the family Araceae. It consists of 7 species that are found only in northeast Madagascar. Arophyton are tuberous plants with a few rhizomatous species that go through a dormant period during the dry season.

Species
 Arophyton buchetii
 Arophyton crassifolium
 Arophyton humbertii
 Arophyton pedatum
 Arophyton rhizomatosum
 Arophyton simplex
 Arophyton tripartitum

References

Aroideae
Araceae genera
Endemic flora of Madagascar